The following is a list of Coastal Carolina Chanticleers men's basketball head coaches. There have been six head coaches of the Chanticleers in their 49-season history.

Coastal Carolina's current head coach is Cliff Ellis. He was hired as the Chanticleers' head coach in July 2007, replacing Buzz Peterson, who left to become director of player personnel with the Charlotte Bobcats.

References

Coastal Carolina

Coastal Carolina Chanticleers men's basketball coaches